The Cocorova is a left tributary of the river Gilort in Romania. It discharges into the Gilort in Poiana.

References

Rivers of Romania
Rivers of Gorj County